The 1898 Drake Bulldogs football team was an American football team that represented Drake University as an independent during the 1898 college football season. In its second season under head coach A. B. Potter, the team compiled a 4–2 record and outscored opponents by a total of 102 to 55.  It was Drake's first winning season. In the final game of the season, the team defeated Nebraska.

Schedule

References

Drake
Drake Bulldogs football seasons
Drake Bulldogs football